New York elected its members November 3–5, 1828.

Overview

See also 
 1828 and 1829 United States House of Representatives elections
 List of United States representatives from New York

Notes

References

Bibliography
 

1828
New York
United States House of Representatives